Luis di Giglio (born 22 May 1989) is an Argentine-born Italian cricketer.  Di Giglio is a right-handed batsman who bowls left-arm medium pace.  He was born in Buenos Aires, Argentina, and was educated at the University of Bologna.

Di Giglio made his debut for Italy in the 2010 European Cricket Championship Division One in Jersey, making three appearances in the tournament against the Netherlands A, Denmark, and Jersey.  He was later selected as part of Italy's squad for the 2012 World Twenty20 Qualifier in the United Arab Emirates.  He made a single Twenty20 appearance during the tournament, against Kenya, bowling two wicketless overs in Kenya's innings of 170/5, while in Italy's chase, he was dismissed for 3 runs by Hiren Varaiya.

In April 2013, he was selected in Italy's fourteen man squad for the World Cricket League Division Three in Bermuda. In November 2019, he was named in Italy's squad for the Cricket World Cup Challenge League B tournament in Oman. He made his List A debut, for Italy against Kenya, on 3 December 2019.

References

External links
Luis di Giglio at ESPNcricinfo
Luis di Giglio at CricketArchive

1989 births
Living people
Sportspeople from Bologna
University of Bologna alumni
Italian cricketers